Bamatat is a populated place in the Vlorë County of Albania. It is part of the municipality of Delvinë. The village is inhabited by Muslim Albanians.

References

Populated places in Delvinë
Villages in Vlorë County